Ornithinimicrobium kibberense is a bacterium species from the genus Ornithinimicrobium which has been isolated from soil from the Indian Himalayas.

References 

 

Actinomycetia
Bacteria described in 2006